Tapin Regency is one of regencies in the Indonesian province of South Kalimantan; the capital is the town of Rantau. The regency's motto is "Ruhui Rahayu", and it is also shared by another Indonesian province East Kalimantan. It covers an area of 2,174.95 km2 and had a population of 167,877 at the 2010 Census and 189,475 at the 2020 Census; the official estimate as at mid 2021 was 191,801.

Administrative districts
Tapin Regency is composed of twelve districts (kecamatan), listed below with their present areas and their 2010 and 2020 Census populations, together with the official estimates as at mid 2021. The table includes the locations of the district administrative centres, the number of administrative villages (desa) in each district, and its post code.

Climate
Rantau, the seat of the regency has a tropical rainforest climate (Af) with moderate rainfall from July to September and heavy to very heavy rainfall from October to June.

References

External links 

 

Regencies of South Kalimantan